"Water and a Flame" is a song recorded by Australian singer Daniel Merriweather for his debut solo album, Love & War. It features vocals from English singer-songwriter Adele. "Water and a Flame" was released as the album's fourth and final single on 2 November 2009. Produced by Eg White and released under Columbia Records, "Water and a Flame" peaked at number 180 on the UK Singles Chart. In 2013, "Water and a Flame" was recorded by Celine Dion for her album, Loved Me Back to Life.

Composition

"Water and a Flame" was described as "a smoky, heartfelt ballad". According to David Balls of Digital Spy, "it finds their rich and soulful vocals dovetailing sweetly - enough to draw attention away from the slightly clichéd chorus".

Music videos 
The song's music video does not feature Adele.

Track listing
Digital single
"Water and a Flame" (featuring Adele) – 3:39
"Water and a Flame" (featuring Adele) (Buzz Junkies Club Mix) – 7:16

Charts

Celine Dion version

Celine Dion covered "Water and a Flame" for her 2013 album, Loved Me Back to Life. It was once again produced by Eg White and released as the third single in the United Kingdom. "Water and a Flame" was added to the A List on the BBC Radio 2 Playlist on 6 February 2014 and the commercial single was scheduled for release in the UK on 24 March 2014. On 11 April 2014, "Water and a Flame" was officially sent to Contemporary hit radio in Italy.

Background and release
On 8 August 2012, Le Journal de Montréal wrote that Dion's upcoming English-language studio album will contain songs written and produced by Eg White, who worked with Adele on 19 and 21. The fragment of the first song, "Water and a Flame" premiered on The Katie Couric Show on 25 April 2013 and a behind-the-scenes look at Dion and White recording the song was posted on singer's official website the next day. On 29 August 2013, Billboard wrote that Dion's upcoming album Loved Me Back to Life is her edgiest record to date and it includes "Water and a Flame", which finds Dion utilizing the lower, grainier register of her voice. The video titled "Making of Water and a Flame" was released onto Dion's Vevo channel on 30 October 2013 and the official audio of the song premiered there on 5 November 2013. Eg White also co-wrote and produced another song on Loved Me Back to Life, "Didn't Know Love". On 6 February 2014, Dion's official website announced "Water and a Flame" as the third UK single. The song was added to the A List on the BBC Radio 2 Playlist and the commercial single was scheduled for release in the UK on 24 March 2014. However, the commercial single was withdrawn at the last minute. The song peaked at number thirty on the UK Radio Airplay Chart in early March 2014. On 11 April 2014, "Water and a Flame" was sent to radio in Italy.

Controversy
Loved Me Back to Life was originally to be titled Water and a Flame. In an April 2013 interview on The Katie Couric Show, Dion played a recording of her cover of "Water and a Flame". Right before hearing the song, Katie Couric asked Dion and her husband/manager, René Angélil, in reference to the then title of the album: "where did 'Water and a Flame' come from?" Angélil responded, "It's, you know, the opposites," and Dion replied, "It's the name of the song". Musician Samantha Ronson, who is a friend of Daniel Merriweather's, wrote a blog post that included the video of the interview and the text "Dear Celine Dion, when you COVER someone else's song - you might want to give them credit".

In June 2013, Merriweather linked to Ronson's post from his Facebook page and harshly criticized Dion, writing, "This song has every ounce of my heartache and pain in it and she pretends as if she wrote it herself". Two days later, Dion's management responded on her website, saying that, while Dion often does not mention the writers of her songs, she has been very vocal about the fact that she does not write her own songs, that she did not intend any harm by the omission, and that all of the writers and producers were always credited on the liner notes. On 25 July 2013, Dion's website confirmed that the album was re-titled to Loved Me Back to Life.

Critical reception
"Water and a Flame" garnered favorable reviews from music critics. The song was a track-pick in Stephen Thomas Erlewine's review of Dion's Loved Me Back to Life on AllMusic. The New York Times review by Jon Caramanica and Nate Chinen said: "Celine, her show at Caesars Palace in Las Vegas... has perhaps pushed Ms. Dion to new levels of pizazz. Several of the album's new songs would fit seamlessly into that revue — "Water and a Flame" has genuine R&B swagger". Jim Farber of the Daily News stated, "The Winehouse-y number finds Dion fully convincing in her woozy, boozy phrasing". Mike Wass, of Idolator wrote, "It's an inspired choice, taking Celine down an entirely different path. It's very Adele – all smoky vocals and retro soul production complete with gorgeous strings. This is a great sound for the diva and she should consider revisiting it on future endeavors".

Live performances
On 28 October 2013, Dion performed "Water and a Flame" live for the very first time on Today in New York City. The next day, she sang it again at the Edison Ballroom in New York City during her intimate concert. Andrew Hampp from Billboard was impressed by her rendition of "Water and a Flame", and wrote that Dion impressively turned it into her own "gin-soaked" breakup ballad. Later, "Water and a Flame" was included on the setlist of Dion's Sans attendre Tour which started in Belgium on 21 November 2013 and ended in France on 5 December 2013. The performance from one of the 2013 sold-out Paris shows was included on the Céline une seule fois / Live 2013 (2014) as a CD bonus. She also performed the song during her appearance on the Today Show on 22 July 2016.

Charts

Credits and personnel
Recording
Recorded at Abbey Road Studios, London (strings) and Eg White Studio, London (other instruments)
Vocals recorded at Echo Beach Studios, Jupiter, Florida
Mixed at Larrabee Studios, North Hollywood, Los Angeles

Personnel

Songwriting – Eg White, Daniel Merriweather
Production – White
Recording engineer – White
Vocals recording – François Lalonde
Vocals recording assistant – Raymond Holzknecht
Mixing – Manny Marroquin
Mixing assistants – Chris Galland, Delbert Bowers
Bass, drums, percussion, guitar, piano – White
String arrangement –White
Violins – Janice Graham, Magnus Johnston, Marije Ploemacher, Jonathan Evans Jones, Annabelle Meare, Harvey de Souza, Hannah Dawson, Helen Cox, Beatrix Lovejoy, Kotno Sato
Violas – Timothy Grant, Becky Low, Simone van der Giessen
Cellos – Richard Harwood, Rowena Calvert, Jassie Anne Richardson

Release history

References

External links

2000s ballads
2009 singles
2009 songs
2014 singles
Adele songs
Celine Dion songs
Daniel Merriweather songs
Columbia Records singles
Contemporary R&B ballads
Music videos directed by Philip Andelman
Rock ballads
Songs written by Daniel Merriweather
Songs written by Eg White
Soul ballads